Nsaka University (NSU) is a private university in Uganda.

Location
The university campus sits on a  site, located at Mafubira, a neighborhood in the city of Jinja, off the Jinja-Kamuli Road. The coordinates of Nsaka University Campus are 0°27'56.0"N, 33°12'21.0"E (Latitude:0.465556; Longitude:33.205833).

History
The university opened on 13 January 2009 with 20 undergraduate students. The institution was given provisional accreditation by the Uganda National Council for Higher Education in 2013.

Academic courses
, the following courses were offered at Nsaka University:

Undergraduate degree courses

 Bachelor of Procurement and Logistics Management.
 Bachelor of Business Administration.
 Bachelor of Arts in Education.
 Bachelor of Information Technology.
 Bachelor of Business Computing.
 Bachelor of Guidance and Counselling. 
 Bachelor of Mass Communication.
 Bachelor of Human Resource Management.
 Bachelor of Public Administration.
 Bachelor of Community Development and Adult Education.

Diploma courses
 Diploma in Business Administration. 
 Diploma in Procurement and Logistics Management.
 Diploma in Accounting and Finance. 
 Diploma in Computing and Networking. 
 Diploma in Community Development. 
 Diploma in Information Technology. 
 Diploma in Mass Communication. 
 Diploma in Counseling & Guidance. 
 Diploma in Education.

See also
 Jinja District
 Education in Uganda
 List of universities in Uganda
 List of Business Schools in Uganda
 Ugandan university leaders
 List of university leaders in Uganda

References

External links

Universities and colleges in Uganda
Jinja District
Busoga
Educational institutions established in 2009
2009 establishments in Uganda